Mia Isobel Wray-McCann (born 28 October 1995), known professionally as Mia Wray, is an Australian pop singer, songwriter and musician from Noosa, Queensland.

Born and raised in Noosa before later relocating to Melbourne, Wray rose to prominence after winning the 2011 iteration of Telstra's Road to Discovery Program. She independently released two extended plays, Mia Wray (2014) and Send Me Your Love (2016), before releasing her debut single "Work for Me" in 2020.

Wray began her career performing soul, blues and folk music, with her musical style later shifting to encompass genres such as pop and bedroom pop whilst retaining soul influences. She has toured with the Rubens and the Teskey Brothers, and is scheduled to support Vance Joy on his Long Way Home Tour in 2022.

Wray signed to Ivy League Records in January 2021 and received nominations for Breakthrough Independent Artist of the Year at the 2021 AIR Awards, Best Solo Artist at the 2021 Music Victoria Awards, and placed second in the Performance category at the International Songwriting Competition.

Early life
Wray was born Mia Isobel Wray-McCann in Sunrise Beach, Noosa, Queensland, on 28 October 1995, the daughter of Carolyn. At the age of 11, Wray's parents inherited her late grandfather's piano, and moved it into Mia's bedroom upon discovering it was the only room of the house big enough for it. Wray learnt to play it from that age onwards, and began to write songs in her adolescent years. She would later learn to play the guitar through video lessons on YouTube.

Wray completed her senior secondary education at St Andrew's Anglican College in Peregian Springs, Queensland.

Musical style and influences
Wray began her career in 2011 as a folk-pop and acoustic artist, citing the Beatles, Paul Kelly, Bob Dylan, Pete Murray, Laura Marling, and Gabrielle Aplin among her sonic influences. Wray described herself at the time as a soul, blues and folk musician. Wray has listed Gabrielle Aplin, Coldplay, Paul Kelly, and Bob Dylan as being several of her favourite musicians. Wray has since shifted to more pop-oriented music, drawing influence from Florence and the Machine, Lana Del Rey and Maggie Rogers. Her music has been additionally described as bedroom pop, blues, folk-pop, indie pop, and soul.

Wray can play the piano, guitar, the harmonica and the foot drum.

Wray's music has received favourable comparisons to that of Lorde, Meg Mac, Vera Blue, Florence and the Machine, and Adele.

Career

2011–2019: Breakthrough and Mia Wray
On 3 December 2011, Wray was announced as the joint finalist of the 2011 Telstra Road to Discovery talent development program, alongside Andrew Redford from Maroochydore, Queensland. On 24 January 2012, the pair competed in the final of the quest, held during the 40th Tamworth Country Music Festival. On 13 February, Wray was announced as the recipient of the Telstra Road to Discovery People's Choice Award. Wray signed with Mushroom Records following her People's Choice Award win. On 2 July 2014, Wray released her debut extended play Mia Wray. Mia Wray was recorded in Gippsland, Victoria over five days and was produced by Greg Walker. A track from the EP, "Where I Stand", was featured on the soundtrack for the film Midnight Sun (2018). On 5 October 2015, Wray performed at the Caloundra Music Festival. On 22 April 2016, Wray released her second extended play Send Me Your Love. Send Me Your Love was recorded in Nashville, Tennessee, with production from Brad Jones. The same day, Wray performed as the opening act for former Powderfinger guitarist Darren Middleton at Red Hot Music, in Devonport, Tasmania. On 17 February 2017, Wray featured on French producer Aslove's cover of Corinne Bailey Rae's song "Put Your Records On".

2020–2021: "Work for Me" and "Never Gonna be the Same"
On 9 May 2020, Wray appeared as part of online music initiative The State of Music, where she performed Helen Reddy's "I Am Woman" alongside Kate Miller-Heidke, Mahalia Barnes, and Missy Higgins. On 13 September, Wray's debut single "Work for Me" was premiered on Triple J's 2020 program with Richard Kingsmill. "Work for Me" was officially released on 16 September, alongside an accompanying music video. Triple J described the song as having "stomping percussion, electrifying brass and empowering AF songwriting". On 28 September, Wray was announced as the Triple J Unearthed Feature Artist on Triple J for that week. On 24 October, Wray was announced as one of the acts scheduled to perform on the premiere of the second season of Australian live music program The Sound. On 31 October, Wray performed on the 32nd edition of Isol-Aid, an Instagram live music festival created during the COVID-19 pandemic. On 1 November, Wray performed an a cappella version of "Work for Me" from Athenaeum Theatre, Melbourne for The Sounds season two premiere. On 20 November, Wray featured as a backing vocalist on the song "Blue Bird" from Something for Kate's seventh studio album The Modern Medieval (2020). On 20 January 2021, Ivy League Records announced that they had signed Wray to their roster. The same day, she released the single "Never Gonna Be the Same". "Never Gonna Be the Same" was added to rotation by Triple J on 25 January 2021. On 27 February, Wray supported Something for Kate at the Summer Sounds Festival at the Sidney Myer Music Bowl. On 9 March, Wray announced her debut headline tour, a four-date residency at the Northcote Social Club, in Northcote, Victoria. On 9 April, Wray was announced as a support act for the Teskey Brothers' concert at the Forum Theatre in Melbourne, held in support of the band's live album named after the venue. The one-off concert took place on 21 April 2021. On 22 April, Wray announced her first east coast tour, in support of the single "Never Gonna Be the Same". Throughout April and May, Wray supported the Rubens alongside Alice Ivy on their national Live in Life Tour. On 4 May, "Work for Me" placed second in the Performance category at the 2021 iteration of the International Songwriting Competition. On 2 June, Wray was announced as a nominee for Breakthrough Independent Artist of the Year at the 2021 AIR Awards; alternative rock band Spacey Jane were later announced as the recipient of the award on 5 August. On 3 June, Wray released the single "Needs". On 13 September, "Work for Me" was shortlisted for Best Song at the 2021 Music Victoria Awards. On 4 November, Wray was announced as a support act for the Oceanian leg of Melbourne musician Vance Joy's 2022 Long Way Home Tour, alongside the Rubens, Thelma Plum, Middle Kids and Budjerah.

2022: Stay Awake 
On 19 January 2022, Wray was announced as one of the performers at the 2022 Australian Open. On 30 March, Wray premiered the single "Rerun" on Triple J's Good Nights program with Bridget Hustwaite. "Rerun" was released later the same day. Alongside the release, Wray announced a four-date residency at the Gem, in Collingwood, Victoria, which were scheduled to take place on 14, 21, and 28 April, before they were ultimately cancelled due to "unforeseen circumstances". On 10 August, Wray's single "Evidence" was premiered on Good Nights with Bridget Hustwaite, before being released the same evening.

In November 2022, Wray announced the forthcoming release of EP Stay Awake, scheduled for release on 10 February 2023.

Personal life
Wray currently resides in Melbourne, Victoria, with her partner Drew Hammond.

Discography

Extended plays

Singles

As lead artist

As featured artist

Guest appearances

Filmography

Television

Music videos

Concert tours

Headlining
 Northcote Social Club Residency Tour (2021)
 Never Gonna Be the Same Tour (2021)
 The Gem Residency Tour (2022; cancelled)

Supporting
 Live in Life Tour – the Rubens (2021) 
 The Forum Concert – the Teskey Brothers (2021)
 Long Way Home Tour – Vance Joy (2022)

Awards and nominations

AIR Awards

! 
|-
! scope="row"| 2021
| Herself
| Breakthrough Independent Artist of the Year
| 
| 
|}

International Songwriting Competition

! 
|-
! scope="row"| 2021
| "Work for Me"
| Performance
| 
| 
|}

Music Victoria Awards

! 
|-
! scope="row" rowspan="2"| 2021
| "Work for Me"
| Best Song
| 
| 
|-
| Herself
| Best Solo Artist
| 
| 
|}

Telstra Road to Discovery Program
Wray (alongside fellow Sunshine Coast resident Andrew Redford), was named as one of ten finalists for the 2012 Telstra Road to Discovery talent development program on 3 December 2011, before being announced as the winner of the People's Choice Award on 13 February 2012.

! 
|-
! scope="row"| 2012
| Telstra Road to Discovery Program
| People's Choice Award
| 
| 
|}

References

External links
 
 

1995 births
21st-century Australian singers
21st-century Australian women singers
Australian blues singers
Australian folk singers
Australian folk-pop singers
Australian indie pop musicians
Australian soul singers
Australian women pop singers
Australian women singer-songwriters
Bedroom pop musicians
Ivy League Records artists
Living people
Musicians from Queensland
Singers from Melbourne